Tephritis separata is a species of tephritid or fruit flies in the genus Tephritis of the family Tephritidae.

Distribution
Britain, central & south Europe East to Russia, Kazakhstan & Israel.

References

Tephritinae
Insects described in 1871
Diptera of Europe
Diptera of Asia
Taxa named by Camillo Rondani